Williams v. California was a class action lawsuit filed by the American Civil Liberties Union (ACLU) against the State of California, on behalf of California students, parents and other educational stakeholders, citing the substandard quality of learning resources at Balboa High School as a prominent example.

Filed in 2000 by the ACLU to address  "savagely unequal"  conditions across California schools, the lawsuit highlighted a failure to provide adequate facilities, textbooks, and teachers for the poorest schools in the state. Balboa students joined the lawsuit; and the case was named after Eliezer Williams, then a middle school student soon to enter Balboa. The lawsuit was resolved in 2004, with the State of California agreeing to provide US$138 million for instructional material, US$50 million for critical facility repairs at nearly 2,400 state schools, and to reimburse school districts for future repairs of deficient facilities. Estimates indicate California may be liable for up to US$1 billion in reimbursements over several years.

The "Williams Settlement", often mis-labeled "Williams Act", became a common reference in California discussions around education policy and procedures, especially as the COVID-19 pandemic compelled many urgent expansions of distance education and consequent reviews of education systems.

References 

California state case law